Rangeelay is a 2013 Punjabi movie directed by Navaniat Singh, featuring Jimmy Sheirgill and Neha Dhupia in the lead roles. The movie is produced by Jimmy Shergill in association with Eros International, and it marks Neha Dhupia's debut in Punjabi cinema. The movie was released on 16 May 2013. The film opened to average opening in India and poor opening overseas. Rangeelay was also a critical failure.

After Dharti(2011) and Taur Mittran Di(2012), this film is the third production of Jimmy Sheirgill Productions.

Cast
Jimmy Sheirgill as Sunny
Neha Dhupia as Simmi
Diljit Singh as dj
Pankesh Mann as Maan
Jaswinder Bhalla as DSP
Shivinder Mahal as Major Saab
Binnu Dhillon as Titli
Rana Ranbir as Shotgun
 Jassi Kaur as Jassi
Angad Bedi as Ricky And Vicky(Double Role)

Songs
 "Rangeelay" (Title Song) by Babbal Rai
 "Headache" by Mika Singh
 "Tere Bina Din Mere" by Feroz Khan
 "Yaara Tu" by Ashim Kemson & Shipra Goyal
 "Dil De Kutte" by Jashan Singh
 "Boloyaan" by Nishawn Bhullar & Simran-Tripat
 "Dil De Kutte" by Sonu Nigam

Bollywood celebrity Neha Dhupia made her debut in Punjabi films with Rangeelay.

References

2013 films
Punjabi-language Indian films
2010s Punjabi-language films